Santisimo Rosario Integrated High School (Filipino: Pinagsamang Mataas na Paaralan ng Santisimo Rosario. abbreviated as SRIHS or Stmo. Rosario IHS) is a public secondary school located at Barangay Santisimo Rosario, San Pablo City, Laguna, Philippines established in 1995. It offers junior and senior secondary education. The senior high education course consists of Agriculture, Fisheries, and General Education. It is the first public high school in San Pablo City that produced senior high school graduates since the implementation of K-12 curriculum by Department of Education in 2012.

History

San Pablo City National High School Santisimo Annex (1995–2004) 
Due to unprecedented increasing number of enrollees in San Pablo City National High School. The SPCNHS can no longer accommodate all the students in the city. The City Government of San Pablo City decided to established satellite schools across the barangay called annex to solve the problem. One of the barangays for establishing satellite secondary school is Barangay Santisimo. Elias Corales† the barangay chairman on that time donated a hectare land in order to build a barangay secondary school named Santisimo Rosario Annex according to city ordinance number 93-3 dated July 1, 1993. On June 1, 1995, Santisimo Annex was started as a single three-room building standing in an open field without fences. Four pioneer teachers were assigned in Santisimo Rosario Annex named Ronie Nacario was the first designated as Teacher-in-Charge, Teresa Yema, Maritess Fandiño, and Michelle D. Benedictos. In 1996 Editha L. Fule assigned as Teacher-in-Charge of Santisimo Annex. Since 1996 more additional school buildings are constructed with the help of the local government, parents and teachers' association (PTA), and Non-Government Organizations (NGO). In 1999, first commencement exercises (four-year curriculum) of rosarians was held in Rizal Hall, San Pablo City Central School. In 2001 the school perimeter fence was built. A major school landscape was initiated by the freshmen in 2003 also the institution hires Jayson Bargados, the first security guard for the school's security. The first computer room was built in 2004 with the help of Personal Computers for Public Schools (PCPS) program by Department of Trade and Industry (DTI).

Santisimo Rosario National High School (2005–2018) 
In 2005, a major restructuring of faculty members occurred. Half of the original faculty members were transferred to other schools and replaced with newer set of teaching force and in the same year Santisimo Annex gained independence from San Pablo City National High School and renamed as Santisimo Rosario National High School. After gaining a new school identity, white-green uniform were replaced by aqua green in June 2006. Using of flash drives as storage devices instead of floppy disks for saving documents was introduced and another school renovation led by school volunteer Paulton Sityar was held on the same year. First internet access was made possible by Gearing Up Internet Literacy & Access for Students (GILAS) project in 2007 spearheaded by Airnel Abarra also a treehouse was built inside the campus for the preparation of hosting Science Camp. In 2012 Physical Education uniforms were standardized. Due to the remoteness of Barangay Atisan which was located on the foot of the Mount Malepunyo and San Isidro National High School and can no longer accommodate more students from that barangay, the SRNHS extension was established.

As the DepEd shifted to K-12 curriculum. Santisimo Rosario NHS gathered accreditation to offer senior high school program. Due to the proximity of the school in the rice fields and Barangay Santisimo is an agricultural area, the institution offers senior high school program specialized in agriculture, fisheries, and general education track. In 2015 the last batch of old curriculum was graduated within the same year senior high school program began. In 2016, the senior high building was built. First commencement exercises for senior high school graduates was held on April 6, 2017. General Academic Studies senior high course was opened in June 2017. Also within the same year, greenhouses was donated by Department of Agriculture. SRNHS first and oldest school building was upgraded into a 4-story building to accommodate even more students.

Santisimo Rosario Integrated High School (2019–Present) 
In 2019, Because the senior high school and junior high school buildings was in the same area and location. Santisimo Rosario National High School was renamed as Santisimo Rosario Integrated High School as declared by Department of Education. Also the SRNHS extension in Brgy. Atisan became a fully independent institution renamed as Atisan Integrated School.

Uniforms 

In earlier years as Santisimo Rosario Annex, the uniform of San Pablo City National High School is used. It is a white polo and slacks for boys white for girls it is white blouse, green checkered necktie and skirts. "Tuck-IN" (tucked polo clothes) Policy for boys is strictly implemented. When it became a National High School a new uniform is introduced where the boys wear aqua-green polo and slacks while the girls where aqua-green blouse, navy-blue (with multiple colored grid design) skirts, belt buckles, and necktie. The new uniform was conceived by Editha L. Fule. This new uniforms removed the "Tuck-IN" Policy which was implemented for boys. On its first and early deployment, it caught attention by many private and public schools mistakenly identified as a new established school and the students are always asked what school came from. Wearing of slacks for senior high schools girls and aqua-green senior high school uniform is introduced in 2015. P.E. uniforms often changed annually until it was standardized in 2012. The standard Physical Education uniform is aqua-green T-shirt and gray jogging pants with dark green strip on the right.

List of Principals and Teacher-in-Charge

List of Faculty Members

List School Staff

List of Newspaper Published

Awards and Achievements

References 

Schools in San Pablo, Laguna
High schools in Laguna (province)
Educational institutions established in 1995
1995 establishments in the Philippines